Justin Ryder (born 14 July 1980 in Nepean), also known by the nickname of Knight Rider, is an Australian former professional rugby league footballer who played in the 2000s.

References

External links
Wildcats land Aussie pair
Wakefield Trinity Wildcats
Warrington 34-20 Wakefield
Wakefield 21-27 Hull
Huddersfield state their case
St Helens 26-20 Wakefield
Wakefield 14-20 Wigan
Huddersfield 6-38 Wakefield
Wakefield 32-26 Warrington
Widnes 25-24 Wakefield
Wakefield 46-18 Salford

1980 births
Australian rugby league players
Living people
Newcastle Knights players
Rugby league wingers
Wakefield Trinity players
Rugby league players from New South Wales